Trent Schmutter (born 27 August 1987 in Sydney) is an Australian former professional outfielder who had played for Sydney Blue Sox.

In 2011, he was awarded the 2010-11 Australian Baseball League season Rookie of the Year.

In 2023 Trent started his PHS career teaching the SLR year 12 class

References

External links

1987 births
Living people
Australian baseball players
Baseball outfielders
Baseball players from Sydney
Sydney Blue Sox players